Rita Faye Lin (born 1978) is an American lawyer and jurist serving as an associate judge of the San Francisco County Superior Court. She is the nominee to serve as a judge of the United States District Court for the Northern District of California.

Education 

Lin earned a Bachelor of Arts from Harvard University in 2000 and a Juris Doctor from the Harvard Law School in 2003.

Career 

In 2003 and 2004, Lin served as a law clerk for Judge Sandra Lynch of the United States Court of Appeals for the First Circuit. She joined Morrison & Foerster in San Francisco as an associate in 2004 and later became a partner at the firm. From 2014 to 2018, she served as an assistant United States attorney for the Northern District of California. She was appointed to serve as a judge of the San Francisco County Superior Court by Governor Jerry Brown in 2018. Lin is an adjunct professor of law at the University of California, Hastings College of the Law, where in the fall 2021 semester she co-taught a course on criminal procedure.

Notable cases 

Lin worked pro bono as co-counsel against the Defense of Marriage Act, which was declared unconstitutional on February 22, 2012, in U.S. District Court in California.

Nomination to district court 

On July 29, 2022, President Joe Biden announced his intent to nominate Lin to serve as a United States district judge of the United States District Court for the Northern District of California. On August 1, 2022, her nomination was sent to the Senate. President Biden nominated Lin to the seat vacated by Judge Edward M. Chen, who assumed senior status on May 17, 2022. On November 30, 2022, a hearing on her nomination was held before the Senate Judiciary Committee. During her confirmation hearing, she was questioned about an article she wrote while a student at Harvard Law. In the article, Lin wrote that members of the Christian coalition are "bigots". Lin said she no longer agrees with that view.

On January 3, 2023, her nomination was returned to the President under Rule XXXI, Paragraph 6 of the United States Senate. She was renominated on January 23, 2023. On February 9, 2023, her nomination was reported out of committee by a 12–9 vote. Her nomination is pending before the United States Senate. If confirmed, Lin would be the second Asian Pacific American woman—and first Chinese American woman—to serve on the U.S. District Court for the Northern District of California.

Personal life 

Lin has a hearing disability.

See also 
 List of Asian American jurists

References 

1978 births
Living people
21st-century American judges
21st-century American women judges
21st-century American women lawyers
21st-century American lawyers
American jurists of Chinese descent
Assistant United States Attorneys
California lawyers
California state court judges
Harvard Law School alumni
Lawyers from San Francisco
People associated with Morrison & Foerster
People from Oakland, California
University of California, Hastings faculty
Harvard College alumni